Into the Blue is a 2005 American action-thriller film starring Paul Walker and Jessica Alba with Scott Caan, Ashley Scott, Josh Brolin and James Frain in supporting roles. The film was directed by John Stockwell and was co-distributed by Metro-Goldwyn-Mayer and Columbia Pictures.

Plot
A sea plane flying on a stormy night malfunctions and crashes in the sea off the coast of The Bahamas.

Jared and Sam are lovers living a rustic life in a trailer, next to the beach in The Bahamas. Sam works as a guide in the local aquatic theme park, while Jared works a number of odd jobs in his field of passion, diving. His real dream is to find one of many treasure-filled merchant and pirate ships lost in the waters around The Bahamas. Derek Bates has similar dreams and a better boat, but Jared turns down repeated offers to work for him.

Jared's childhood friend, Bryce, and his girlfriend, Amanda (whom he just met the night before), come to visit. Bryce, a lawyer in New York City, has acquired the use of a luxury vacation house from a client he defended. While snorkeling, Jared finds artifacts on the sea bed that seem to stem from a ship wreck. The four of them investigate and find several other pieces that turn out to be the remains of legendary French pirate ship Zephyr. They also discover the crashed plane and its cargo of cocaine—Bryce and Amanda want to recover it, but Jared refuses, dispersing the brick they retrieved into the ocean.

Needing money for equipment to salvage the treasure, Bryce and Amanda dive to the plane then try to sell a few bricks of recovered cocaine to local night club owner Primo. Primo turns out to be an associate of drug lord Reyes, to whom the cocaine belonged in the first place.

Jared, Bryce, and Amanda are threatened by Reyes, who demands that they retrieve his cocaine or face deadly consequences. When the trio inform Sam, she berates Jared for violating his principles by helping a drug lord. He tries to explain the situation, but she leaves him, saying that 'they' are over. After nightfall, Jared, Bryce, and Amanda dive at the plane wreck to salvage the cocaine and more artifacts. As they are moving the cocaine packs from the plane to their boat, Amanda is attacked and bitten on the leg by a tiger shark. They abandon the cocaine at the dive site to rush her to the hospital, where she dies. Hearing of the tragedy, Sam reunites with Jared, mourning for the loss of Amanda.

Sam insists on going to the police, and goes to the home of one of hers and Jared's close friends, a local cop named Roy. Roy turns her over to Derek Bates, knowing that he was Reyes' partner in the cocaine deal.  Primo has captured Jared and taken him aboard Reyes' ship, where they find that Bates has killed Reyes and his entire crew, eventually killing Primo and Roy (when he tries to stand up for Sam) as well. Jared manages to escape after learning that Bates killed Reyes and learns of Sam's capture when he and Bryce try to contact her.

Jared and Bryce then set out to rescue Sam from Bates's ship, now nearing the cocaine plane. Sam is handcuffed and gagged with duct tape as Jared too is tied up. As they near the cocaine plane, Jared dives into the water and escapes his bonds, hoping to lure Bates and his men into the water as well. With the help of Bryce who has managed to hide in the plane, Jared is able to kill Bates's divers at the plane with the unintentional help of sharks, while their friend Danny helps Sam dispatch the men on Bates's boat after she manages to escape her shackles. Below, Jared and Bates are the only ones left. After getting Bryce to safety, Jared confronts Bates in the plane, eventually using an air tank as a missile by hammering off the valve. Bates dodges it, but it hits the fuel tank at the back of the plane, causing a major explosion, killing Bates. Sam jumps into the water and rescues Jared who manages to escape.

Six weeks later, the trio is salvaging the Zephyr on Jared's new boat. While trying to bring an old cannon to the surface, the rope breaks and the cannon sinks back down breaking a part of the ship. Jared is ready to call it a night knowing that Sam is more important to him than treasure, but Bryce who is unwilling to give up dives in again and shouts that he has found gold, much to his friends' excitement.

Cast
Paul Walker as Jared
Jessica Alba as Sam
Scott Caan as Bryce
Ashley Scott as Amanda
Josh Brolin as Bates
James Frain as Reyes
Tyson Beckford as Primo
Dwayne Adway as Roy
Javon Frazer as Danny

Production

Filming
The special features section of the DVD chronicles how much of the film was filmed as live-action shots in the sea off the Bahamas, with live, wild sharks. It shows film crews wearing chain mail as protection, while the cast members perform in the water unprotected. The filming was made possible by the development of shark tourism in the Bahamas. The sharks are used to being hand fed and will not generally attack humans, but as a result, will grab any item that "hits" the water as potential food. In an early scene, Paul Walker has to grab two fins and a dive mask flung to him by Jessica Alba. During filming, he missed the mask. It was never seen again after hitting the water and the DVD suggests that it was taken by a shark.

In an interview with Sean Evans on the 1st of October 2020 (on the film's 15th Anniversary) for his show Hot Ones, Jessica Alba explained how the production had caught a tiger shark, which they then caged. Director John Stockwell wanted her and another actor to be in the water with the tiger shark. Alba refused to get into the water, citing concerns about swimming with a wild tiger shark.

During filming, the cast and crew were invited to parties at fashion executive Peter Nygård's Bahamas residence. Alba said on a press tour that the parties were "gross" and involved girls aged roughly 14 stripping naked in jacuzzis. Nygård sued a Finnish newspaper, Iltalehti, that reported accounts of the parties by cast and crew during the four months of filming. Stockwell said that the house became the location for the production's parties, but that "strange things happened" when local women arrived. Alba said that parties on the weekend began with sports and massages, but young women attending parties on Sunday would have sex in jacuzzis in front of everybody. Alba left the location as she could not stand to be there. Scott would arrive at parties early and leave when local women arrived. Walker said that the parties were strange, but compared the location to Disneyland and said that he spent a lot of time there. Nygård was arrested in 2020 on charges of sex trafficking, including of minors.

Soundtrack
"Good Old Days" – Ziggy Marley
"I Will" – Holly Palmer
"I'll Be" – O S Xperience
"Time of Our Lives (Swiss-American Federation Remix)" – Paul van Dyk feat. Vega 4
"Think It Matters" – Paul Haslinger & Dan di Prima
"Clav Dub" – Rhombus
"No Trouble" – Shawn Barry
"Whoa Now" – Louque
"VIP" – D Bo (produced by Rik Carey of BahaMen)
"J.O.D.D." – Trick Daddy feat. Khia & Tampa Tony
"Of Course Nigga You Can" – Billy Steel
"Perique" – Louque
"Wonderful World, Beautiful People" – Jimmy Cliff
"Remember The times" – Abdel Wright

Release

Box office
Into the Blue was a box office flop. Produced on a budget of $50 million, the film made just $18 million in North America and $26 million internationally for a total of $44 million worldwide.

Critical response
Rotten Tomatoes lists it with a "rotten" rating of 21% based on 125 reviews. The site's consensus is: "Even the endless shots of bronzed beach babes and buffed dudes can't keep this soggy scuba flick's plot from drowning". Metacritic lists a rating of 45 out of 100 based on 28 reviews, which indicates "mixed or average reviews".

Roger Ebert and Richard Roeper were divided on their show At The Movies; in his column, Ebert praised the film as "written, acted and directed as a story, not as an exercise in mindless kinetic energy", while Roeper said, "I don't think there's anything wrong with an escapist adventure, but if you're rolling your eyes in disbelief at the plot and the dialogue, it makes it hard to enjoy the scenery".

Awards

Jessica Alba earned a nomination for Worst Actress at the 26th Golden Raspberry Awards for her performance in the film (as well as for her performance in Fantastic Four), but lost the trophy to Jenny McCarthy for Dirty Love.

Sequel
A sequel, Into the Blue 2: The Reef, was released direct to DVD in 2009. The cast consists of Chris Carmack, Laura Vandervoort, Audrina Patridge and Mircea Monroe although none of the cast from the first film return.

References

External links

Roger Ebert's movie review 

2000s adventure films
2005 films
20th Century Fox films
American action thriller films
Columbia Pictures films
Films set in the Caribbean
Films set in the Bahamas
Films shot in Florida
Films shot in the Bahamas
Films shot in the Cayman Islands
Freediving
Mandalay Pictures films
Metro-Goldwyn-Mayer films
Treasure hunt films
Underwater action films
Films directed by John Stockwell
Films scored by Paul Haslinger
Films featuring underwater diving
2000s English-language films
2000s American films